Norden is a small unincorporated community in Nevada County, California, United States, about  west of Truckee.

Near Norden is the Sugar Bowl Ski Resort and Donner Ski Ranch, located in nearby Placer County.

The Norden post office, named after the lake, opened in 1926, closed in 1943, and reopened in 1947, and is now closed. The nearby Donner post office operated from 1882 to 1926.

The place is named for Charles Van Norden, an official of the  South Yuba Water Company.  The dam was built in 1900 and the resulting lake was named after Van Norden.

The community has a population of 27 as of 2016.

Climate
Norden has a Köppen Climate Classification of Warm-Summer Mediterranean Climate abbreviated as Csb.

References 

Unincorporated communities in California
Unincorporated communities in Nevada County, California